A Girl's Secret is a 2001 Egyptian drama film directed by Magdy Ahmed Aly. It was selected as the Egyptian entry for the Best Foreign Language Film at the 75th Academy Awards, but it was not nominated.

Cast
 Dalal Abdel Aziz as Awatef - Yasmine's mother
 Ezzat Abou Aouf as Khaled - Yasmine's father
 Maya Sheiha as Yasmine

See also
 List of submissions to the 75th Academy Awards for Best Foreign Language Film
 List of Egyptian submissions for the Academy Award for Best Foreign Language Film

References

External links
 

2001 films
2001 drama films
Egyptian drama films
2000s Arabic-language films